The Barcelona Uroloki are an American football team from Barcelona. Barcelona Uroloki have won LNFA Serie B (03,04,05) | LNFA Serie C (21) | LCFA Senior (00,02,03,04,05,19,21) | LCFA 9 Senior (05) | LCFA 7 Senior (02,03,04) | Supercopa Catalana (01)

American football teams established in 1990
Sports clubs in Barcelona
1990 establishments in Spain
American football teams in Catalonia